Adin David Ross (born October 11, 2000) is an American live streamer known for his collaborations with celebrities and livestreams of the NBA 2K and Grand Theft Auto V video games. He previously streamed on Twitch before signing to Kick in 2023.

Early life 
Adin David Ross was born to Jewish parents on October 11, 2000, in Boca Raton, Florida. He moved to New York City for a brief period of time, but decided to live in Three Rivers, California. He attended Woodlake Union High School. Ross had an interest in streaming from a young age and has stated that he skipped his high school prom to stream on Twitch.

Ross revealed on a No Jumper interview with Adam22 that at 12 years old he was stabbed in his sleep by a mentally unstable relative. Ross had nine stitches in his arm while the relative went to jail before being admitted to a mental hospital.

Career 
Ross began regularly streaming on Twitch while living with his sister Naomi Ross. He eventually joined an NBA 2K group called Always Excelling and met Bronny James through it. He gained popularity by playing NBA 2K20 with James and doing wager matches with other streamers and YouTubers. In 2020, Ross was streaming with Bronny when LeBron James joined in on the call, which would later be uploaded on his Twitter page. In November 2020, after being unsatisfied with NBA 2K21 and its creators, Ross started the Twitter hashtag #make2kfunagain, which reached number one, trending worldwide on the platform. At around the same time, Ross began hosting "e-date" streams, where people compete to find a date over Discord, which led to further growth to his Twitch account.

In February 2021, he was the first creator revealed to be in the collective Clout Gang 2.0 and moved out of living with his sister Naomi Ross  and into the Wizza house along with FaZe Banks, Mike Majlak, Sommer Ray, RiceGum, and Tavv Cooperman.

On April 4, 2021, Adin Ross's Twitch channel was targeted by a "bot attack", where an influx of bot followers caused his follower count at the time to surpass three million. Before this occurred, Ross had already gained over a million followers on his channel and was drawing about 30,000 live viewers per stream, according to TwitchBeat.

In May 2021, Ross announced he would be donating 20% of his Twitch revenue to charity. He broke this down into 10% being donated to a charity for LGBT causes and allowing his viewers to decide the charity for the remaining 10%. In June 2022 Ross donated $10,000 to streamer Tony "RSGloryAndGold" Winchester, who had recently announced a brain cancer diagnosis. Four months later on October 12, 2022, Winchester died.

In December 2022, Ross was in talks to interview Kanye West following his controversial remarks about Jewish people, but decided not to do so after West reportedly told Ross on a phone call: "you Jews aren't going to tell me what I can and can't say".

On December 24, 2022, Ross announced an overhaul to his lifestyle and style of content. Announcing that he would be detoxing from the "female-oriented" content that he widely believed helped his success, and began promoting a way of life that was similar to that of a prominent mentor of his, Andrew Tate. With these changes, Ross has also begun to speak widely about his opinions spanning on pornography and masturbation, as well as his opinions on the entire Twitch space and their promotion of the vetted "Hot Tub" streams that are listed in the Twitch "Pools, Hot Tubs, and Beaches" category, in Ross' words, "it's promoting poison".

On February 11, 2023, Ross claimed that following his most recent one week ban on Twitch that the platform reportedly tried to "silence" his voice on the platform for his controversial takes similar to that of Andrew Tate. Following the video he made about the platform silencing him, he went live on Twitch to 64,798 viewers on February 12, 2023, to announce that he will start streaming on the new streaming platform called "Kick" due to its more lenient terms of service compared to Twitch and favorable revenue splits with creators. On "Kick", Ross streamed Super Bowl LVII live to over 100,000 viewers, speculated to be a violation of the Digital Millennium Copyright Act, and also opened the website of Pornhub. On February 23, he announced that he will make a permanent move to Kick.

Controversies 

After influencer Andrew Tate was arrested in Romania on December 29, 2022, five people had been authorized to visit Tate in detention, including Ross, who said he was flying to Romania, but was denied access by the Romanian government. Ross tweeted, "Joe Biden please go ahead and pardon Andrew Tate". Ross continues to support Andrew Tate.

Ross has also been involved in a Twitch "hot-tub stream" controversy with popular streamer Amouranth which has prompted some backlash from fans.

Twitch bans 
On April 10, 2021, Ross was banned from Twitch after YouTuber Zias answered a phone call and called Ross a "faggot". Ross defended himself from the ban by claiming to Twitch staff that he did not say the word and was not in the room at the time. Twitch clarified that based on this information he would be allowed to stream. His followers started trending the hashtag #FreeAdin on Twitter in an attempt to pressure Twitch's decision. He remained banned up until April 12, 2021.

Over a year later, on April 20, 2022, Ross was banned indefinitely due to the use of "hateful slurs or symbols". The reasoning behind this decision was due to the accusation through video evidence that Ross used a homophobic slur on Twitch streamer YourRAGE's livestream. He was able to later resume streaming in June 2022.

Ross was banned from Twitch for the eighth time on February 25, 2023 for "hateful conduct", after he showed his poorly moderated Kick chat on stream, which was flooded with racist and antisemitic messages. This ban has been presumed by many, including Ross, as permanent.

Videography

References 

Twitch (service) streamers
Living people
2000 births
People from Boca Raton, Florida
American YouTubers
People from Tulare County, California
American Jews
American Ashkenazi Jews
Gaming YouTubers
YouTube controversies